Harvey, Harveys or Harvey's may refer to:

Arts, entertainment, and media
 Harvey (play), a 1944 play by Mary Chase about a man befriended by an invisible anthropomorphic rabbit
 Harvey Awards ("Harveys"), one of the most important awards in American comic industry, founded in 1988
 "Harvey", a song by Her's off the album Invitation to Her's, 2018

Films 
 Harvey (1950 film), a 1950 film adapted from Mary Chase's play, starring James Stewart
 Harvey (1996 film), a 1996 American made-for-television film
 Harvey (Hallmark), a 1972 adaptation of Mary Chase's play for the Hallmark Hall of Fame

Characters 
 Harvey (Farscape), a character in the TV show Farscape
 Harvey, a crane engine in Thomas & Friends
 Harvey Beaks, in the Nickelodeon animated series Harvey Beaks
 Harvey Birdman, title character from the teen-adult animated series Harvey Birdman, Attorney at Law
 Harvey Dent, fictional District Attorney and supervillain (as Two-Face) in DC Comics
 Harvey Kinkle, the love interest of the title character on the live-action television series Sabrina the Teenage Witch
 Harvey Shine, the protagonist of the motion picture Last Chance Harvey (2008)
 Harvey Specter, in the TV show Suits
 Harvey Swick, the protagonist of Clive Barker's novel The Thief of Always

Businesses 
 Harvey & Co, an iron foundry and engineering works in Cornwall, England, known as pioneers of the industrial revolution
 Harvey Comics, a publisher of comic books from the 1940s to the 1990s
 Harvey House, the first restaurant chain in the United States, that operated in the late 19th and early 20th century near stations along the Santa Fe Railway
 Harvey's, a fast food restaurant chain in Canada
 Harveys (department store), a defunct department store in downtown Nashville, Tennessee
 Harveys (handbag design and manufacturer), a handbag design and manufacturing company
 Harveys (restaurant), the former restaurant of chef Marco Pierre White
 Harveys Brewery, founded in 1790 in Sussex, England
 Harveys Furniture, a British furniture chain
 Harveys Lake Tahoe, a casino in Stateline, Nevada
 Harveys Supermarkets, a supermarket chain in the southeast United States
 John Harvey & Sons, a wine and sherry blending and merchant business

People 

Harvey (name)

Places

In Australia

Harvey, Western Australia
Harvey railway station, Western Australia

In Canada

Harvey, British Columbia in Fraser-Fort George
Harvey, British Columbia railway station in Harvey, British Columbia
Harvey Parish, New Brunswick, in Albert County
Harvey, Albert County, New Brunswick, a community in Harvey Parish
Harvey, New Brunswick, a village in York County, sometimes called Harvey Station
Harvey, Ontario, in Thunder Bay District
Harvey Station, New Brunswick, in York County

In the United States

Harvey, Arkansas
Harvey, Illinois
Harvey, Iowa
Harvey, Louisiana
Harvey, Michigan
Harvey, North Dakota
Harvey, Virginia
Harvey, West Virginia
Harvey Point, a U.S. Department of Defense and Central Intelligence Agency facility in North Carolina

Other uses
 "Harvey" or "Harvey Smith", term for the V sign
 Harvey armor, a type of naval armour
 Harvey F.C., a soccer team from Harvey, Illinois, USA
 Harvey mannequin, an early medical simulator
 Harvey Wallbanger, a cocktail
 Tropical Storm Harvey, a list of tropical storms with the name "Harvey"
 Hurricane Harvey, a category 4 hurricane and the 8th named storm of the 2017 Atlantic hurricane season
 , a US Navy frigate, later the Royal Navy frigate HMS Labuan (K584)
 Harvey (crater), a lunar impact crater
 HARVEY (software), software that simulates blood flow of the human body

See also
 Harve